Brooke Lassiter Stoehr (born October 19, 1980) is an American college basketball coach and former player.

Career
She is the current head coach of the Louisiana Tech Lady Techsters basketball team of Louisiana Tech University. Before taking over at Louisiana Tech, Stoehr coached for four seasons at Northwestern State.

Louisiana  Tech statistics
Source

Head coaching record

References

External links 
 Brooke Stoehr Arkansas–Little Rock profile
 Brooke Stoehr Louisiana Tech profile
 Brooke Stoehr Southern Miss profile
 Brooke Stoehr Texas Tech profile
 Brooke Stoehr Northwestern State profile

1980 births
Living people
American women's basketball players
Louisiana Tech Lady Techsters basketball players
Florida State Seminoles women's basketball coaches
Little Rock Trojans women's basketball coaches
Louisiana Tech Lady Techsters basketball coaches
Southern Miss Lady Eagles basketball coaches
Texas Tech Lady Raiders basketball coaches
Northwestern State Lady Demons basketball coaches
Point guards
American women's basketball coaches